Shah Abdul Halim Bukhari (January 1945 – 21 June 2022) was a Bangladeshi Deobandi Islamic scholar, educator, religious writer and spiritual figure. In 2018, he was nominated as a member of the Standing Committee of Al-Haiatul Ulya Lil-Jamiatil Qawmia Bangladesh.

Name and lineage
Bukhari was born in January 1945, to a Bengali Muslim family in the village of Rajghata located in Lohagara, Chittagong District. His father, Shah Abdul Ghani Bukhari, was the grandson of Sayyid Ahmad Bukhari who had migrated to Rangoon from Bukhara in Uzbekistan, before settling in Chittagong.

Education
Bukhari began his initial education at the Rajghata Hossainia Azizul Uloom madrasa in his village. He then enrolled at Al Jamia Al Islamia Patiya where he graduated with a Masters in Hadith studies in 1974. The following year, he studied Bengali literature at Patiya. Outside of the Qawmi system, Bukhari had also completed Alim and Kamil from Tangail Alia Madrasa, Fazil from Gopalpur Madrasa and HSC from Tangail Kagmari College. He graduated from Dhaka University. He also completed a two-year course on biochemistry at Dawn Homoeopathic College, Lahore.

Career
Organization of Islamic Conference Bangladesh was established in 1986 with the aim of organizing Islamic conferences all over the country. From its formation to 2015, he was the general secretary of this organization. After the death of Abdur Rahman Bangladeshi in 2015, he became the President. 

He is the Chairman of the Shariah Supervisory Committee of Shahjalal Islami Bank Limited.  He was elected a member of the Advisory Committee at the Central Conference of Hefazat-e-Islam Bangladesh on 15 November 2020.

Tasawwuf

Family
He married Khalesa Begum, daughter of Maulana Ershad from Satkania, Chittagong. He has four sons and three daughters. Everyone in his family is involved in Islamic activities.

Books
His books include: 
Tashilut Tahawi
Tashilul Usul
Tashilut Tirmidhi etc.

See also
Shah Ahmad Shafi
Mahmudul Hasan
Junaid Babunagari
Mamunul Haque
A F M Khalid Hossain

References

External links

1945 births
2022 deaths
Bangladeshi Islamic religious leaders
Deobandis
20th-century Muslim scholars of Islam
Bangladeshi Sunni Muslim scholars of Islam
Al Jamia Al Islamia Patiya alumni
University of Dhaka alumni
Hanafis
Sunni Sufis
People from Lohagara Upazila
Director general of Al Jamia Al Islamia Patiya
Bangladeshi people of Uzbek descent
Bengali Muslim scholars of Islam